Leedale is an unincorporated community in Bell County, in the U.S. state of Texas. According to the Handbook of Texas, the community had a population of 16 in 2000. It is located within the Killeen-Temple-Fort Hood metropolitan area.

History
Leedale was reported to have first been recognized in the early 1900s by the name of Gindale. It reported one business and 25 residents in 1946. There was a store, a gas station, and a cotton gin in the community in 1948, and the population went down to 20 in several scattered homes in 1964 until it absorbed Gindale. Its population was 16 from 1990 through 2000.

Geography

Education
Leedale was described as a school community in the early 1900s. Today, the community is served by the Rogers Independent School District.

References

Unincorporated communities in Texas
Unincorporated communities in Bell County, Texas